Trun No Grah is a collection of poems written in Gujarati by Natwarlal Kuberdas Pandya, better known by his pen name 'Ushnas.' The book received the Narmad Suvarna Chandrak in 1963. It is considered one of the finest works of poetry in Gujarati literature.

Origin 
The poems in Trun No Grah, written by Ushnas between 1959 and 1963, were published during this period in several literary magazines, such as Sanskruti, Kumar, Kshitij, Vishwa Manav, Kavilok, Samarpan, Manjari, Akhandanand, Ruchi, and Milan.

Trun No Grah was published in October 1964 by Harihar Pustakalay, Surat.

Content 
Ushnas composed poems in a variety of formats, including haiku, geet, ghazal, sonnets, free verse, with most composed in Sanskrit meters such as Shikharini.

Awards 
 1963: Narmad Suvarna Chandrak

References

1964 poetry books
Indian poetry collections
Gujarati-language poetry collections